Decachorda is a genus of moths in the family Saturniidae. The genus was erected by Per Olof Christopher Aurivillius in 1898.

Species
Decachorda aspersa Bouvier, 1927
Decachorda aurivilii Bouvier, 1930
Decachorda bouvieri Hering, 1929
Decachorda congolana Bouvier, 1930
Decachorda fletcheri Rougeot, 1970
Decachorda fulvia (Druce, 1886)
Decachorda inspersa Hampson, 1910
Decachorda mombasana Stoneham, 1962
Decachorda pomona Weymer, 1892
Decachorda rosea Aurivillius, 1898
Decachorda seydeli Rougeot, 1970
Decachorda talboti Bouvier, 1930

References

Saturniinae